Europe Raiders is a 2018 action thriller film directed by Jingle Ma, as the third film in his Raiders franchise, following Tokyo Raiders (2000) and Seoul Raiders (2006). The film was released on August 17, 2018. The movie's dialogue contains several lines of Klingon.

Plot 
Lam Choi Fung and Wang Chao Ying are known respectively as the number 1 and 2 of the bounty hunter world for many years. When a surveillance programme 'Hand of God‘ created by world's top hacker Mercury gets stolen, the CIA sends both Lam and Wang to investigate.

Cast
Tony Leung Chiu-wai as Mr. Lam
Kris Wu as Rocky
Tiffany Tang as Ms. Wang
Du Juan as Sophie
George Lam as Mercury
Jakob Graf as Peter Lawson
Alberto Lancellotti as an Italian mafia boss 
Daniel Gutin as CIA Intelligence Director

Special guest appearance
Cung Le as Black Mantis
Jeeja Yanin as White Mantis

Production
Filming began on August 31, 2016 in Italy.

Reception 
As of the opening weekend, the Europe Raiders film has received a score of 9/10 review from Avi Offer, who described it as a crowd pleasing thrill ride.

The film debuted promisingly in second place on its opening Friday in China, but dropped off to the fifth and the seventh place on the weekend due to terrible word of mouth.

References

External links

Hong Kong action thriller films
Hong Kong sequel films
Films directed by Jingle Ma
Films shot in Italy
2018 action thriller films
2010s Mandarin-language films
Chinese action thriller films
2018 films
2010s Hong Kong films